The 2011 Puerto Rico Soccer League season was the 3rd season of Puerto Rico's top-division professional football league. The regular season ran from April to July 2011. The league had planned in 2010 to make use of an Apertura and Clausura format, but this format was not be utilized. The Sevilla FC Puerto Rico won the regular season, but was defeated at the Playoff final by debuting FC Leones de Ponce.

Teams
Fajardo FC, Guaynabo Fluminense FC and Puerto Rico Islanders FC did not compete in the competition, with the Islanders taking part in the inaugural season of the NASL. Nevertheless, FC Leones de Ponce entered the competition, adding up to six clubs the number of teams participating in the season. Three of the clubs —Puerto Rico United SC, CA River Plate Puerto Rico and Sevilla FC Puerto Rico— took part in the inaugural season of the USL Pro. However, due to financial difficulties, the clubs were removed from USL Pro competition after only five games. Completed matches still counted towards the standings and were double both PRSL and USL Pro league matches.

Standings

Results

Matches 1–10

Matches 11–15

During the second half of the seasons, teams will only face each other one time, resulting in an unequal count of Home/Away games.

PlayOffs

* Both quarterfinal and semifinal games have been rescheduled. The original dates were July 26 and 28 respectively.
+ Mayagüez FC (fifth placed) replaced the fourth placed Puerto Rico United SC as it had been suspended by PRSL.

References

External links
Official website 

Puerto Rico Soccer League seasons
1
Puerto Rican
Puerto Rican